Dominic James Colenso (born 27 August 1981) is an English speaker, communications expert and former professional actor.

Early life
Colenso was born in Harlow, Essex. At the age of seven, he moved to Benson, a small village in rural Oxfordshire. There, he appeared in his primary school’s musicals, sang in the choir and acted in youth productions with the local amateur drama society. He completed his secondary school education at the local comprehensive, Wallingford School. He attained an A* grade for GCSE Drama and was once again an active participant in the school productions. Colenso was also an avid rugby player, playing for a local club, his school and representing Oxfordshire on numerous occasions.

In 1997 Colenso moved with his family to Germany where he attended The International School of Düsseldorf. It was here that he decided to become a professional actor, taking part in as many acting-related activities as possible. While maintaining his academic studies he travelled all over Europe to drama and singing festivals. He played the leading roles in many productions and undertook some directing as well.

Whilst living in Germany, he also had the opportunity to go to Tanzania for one month to teach English in a summer school program. Colenso felt a great affinity with the country, its culture and its people. In 2001, he returned once more to teach English.

Career
Colenso graduated from Drama Centre London in 2002 with a BA honours in Acting. After this intensive three-year training he went straight into work as a professional actor.

He appeared in the film "Thunderbirds" playing Virgil Tracy and in the television programme "Midsomer Murders - Ghosts Of Christmas Past."

External links

1981 births
Living people
20th-century English male actors
21st-century English male actors
English male film actors
English male television actors
Male actors from Essex
People from Harlow